{{safesubst:#invoke:RfD||Humanities and Social Sciences|month = March
|day = 13
|year = 2023
|time = 22:09
|timestamp = 20230313220940

|content=
REDIRECTScience Publishing Group

}}